The Halcón M-1943 is a submachine gun of Argentine origin and is chambered in both 9×19mm Parabellum, used by  the Argentine Army, and in .45 ACP for the police, though neither used it in front-line roles.

References

External links

9mm Parabellum submachine guns
.45 ACP submachine guns
Submachine guns of Argentina
World War II military equipment of Argentina
Fábrica de Armas Halcón firearms
Weapons and ammunition introduced in 1943